Balbir Singh is a name of Indian origin, especially common among the Punjabi Sikhs. It may refer to:

Indian hockey players
 Balbir Singh Sr. (1923–2020), field hockey player
 Balbir Singh Kullar (1942–2020), field hockey player and Punjab Police Officer
 Balbir Singh Kular (born 1945), field hockey player and Colonel in the Indian Army
 Balbir Singh (field hockey, born 1945), field hockey player

Politicians
 Dr. Balbir Singh, MLA and Punjab, India politician
 Balbir Singh (Haryana politician) (born 1974), Indian politician
 Balbir Singh (Himachal Pradesh politician) (born 1963), Indian politician
 Balbir Singh (Jammu and Kashmir politician) (active from 1967); see Billawar (Vidhan Sabha constituency)
 Balbir Singh Rajewal, farmer leader and Punjab, India politician
 Balbir Singh Seechewal (born 1962), Indian activist and MP
 Balbir Singh Sidhu (politician) Punjab MLA (2012-22)

Other people
Balbir Singh Hriksen Thapa (1915–2003), known as Yogi Naraharinath
 Balbir Singh Pama, Lieutenant General in the Indian Army
 Mrs Balbir Singh (1912–1994), Indian cookbook author
 Balbir Singh (scholar) (1896–1974), Indian scholar and writer

Other uses
 Murder of Balbir Singh Sodhi, a crime shortly after the September 11th terror attacks